Theodoridas of Syracuse was a lyric and epigrammatic poet from Syracuse, who is supposed to have lived at the same time as Euphorion, about 235 BC; for, on the one hand, Euphorion is mentioned in one of the epigrams of Theodoridas, and, on the other hand, Clement of Alexandria quotes a verse of Euphorion , where Schneider suggests the emendation .

He had a place in the Garland of Meleager. In addition to the eighteen epigrams ascribed to him in the Greek Anthology, about the genuineness of some of which there are doubts, he wrote a lyric poem , upon which a commentary was written by Dionysius, named , a dithyramb titled "The Centaurs", licentious verses of the kind called , and some other poems, of which we have a few fragments, but not the titles.  The name is more than once confused with Theodorus and Theodoritos.

References

Ancient Greek lyric poets
Epigrammatists of the Greek Anthology
Ancient Syracusans
3rd-century BC Greek people
3rd-century BC poets
Poets of Magna Graecia